Quararibea dolichopoda is a species of flowering plant in the family Malvaceae. It is found only in Panama. It is threatened by habitat loss.

References

dolichopoda
Endemic flora of Panama
Endangered flora of North America
Taxonomy articles created by Polbot
Taxobox binomials not recognized by IUCN